Mount Freeman  is a prominent mountain,  high, surmounting the base of Walker Ridge,  northwest of Mount Lepanto, in the Victory Mountains of Victoria Land, Antarctica. It was mapped by the United States Geological Survey from surveys and U.S. Navy air photos, 1960–64, and was named by the Advisory Committee on Antarctic Names for Lieutenant Elliott R. Freeman, U.S. Navy Reserve, a helicopter aircraft commander during Operation Deep Freeze, 1968.

References

Mountains of Victoria Land
Borchgrevink Coast